Kieron Robert Nnamdi Achara MBE (born 3 July 1983) is a Scottish professional basketball player who last played for the Glasgow Rocks. He is a 6'10" (2.08 m) forward who played college basketball at Duquesne University and represented Scotland and Great Britain at national team level.

Professional career
After graduating from Duquesne University Achara turned professional in 2008. He began his career abroad in Italy. He came back to Scotland in 2010 when he joined Scotland's only professional basketball team, the Glasgow Rocks.  On 26 September 2010, Achara debuted for the Glasgow Rocks in a game against Sheffield Sharks, which they won 80–76. Following two successful years in Spain Achara signed a short two-week contract in 2012 with the Glasgow Rocks. After further spells in Europe, Achara re-signed for the Rocks for the 2014-15 season. He retired in 2019 after reaching three BBL Cup finals with the team (2015, 2017 and 2019), finishing on the losing side on each occasion.

Achara was recognised by Stirling Highland Games as a famous born son of Stirling and offered him the honorary position as their 2019 Games Chieftain.

National team career
Achara is the youngest player ever to play for the Scotland national team, featuring in the FIBA Europe Promotion Cup. He made his debut for Great Britain in 2008, shortly before turning professional. Achara was a part of the British Basketball team which took part in the London 2012 Olympics.

References

External links
College Bio
Great Britain Basketball Profile
Legabasket Profile

1983 births
Living people
Basketball players at the 2012 Summer Olympics
Bàsquet Manresa players
Duquesne Dukes men's basketball players
British expatriate basketball people in Greece
British expatriate basketball people in Italy
British expatriate basketball people in Spain
Fortitudo Pallacanestro Bologna players
Glasgow Rocks players
Kavala B.C. players
Liga ACB players
Olympic basketball players of Great Britain
Pallacanestro Biella players
PBC Academic players
Power forwards (basketball)
Scottish men's basketball players
Scottish expatriate sportspeople in Italy
Scottish expatriate sportspeople in Spain
Sportspeople from Stirling
S.S. Felice Scandone players
Basketball players at the 2018 Commonwealth Games
British expatriate basketball people in the United States
Commonwealth Games competitors for Scotland
Scottish expatriate sportspeople in the United States
Scottish expatriate sportspeople in Greece
Members of the Order of the British Empire
People educated at Stirling High School
Scottish people of Nigerian descent
Black British sportsmen
Expatriate basketball people in Bulgaria
Scottish expatriate sportspeople in Bulgaria